Travis Michael Bergen (born October 8, 1993) is an American professional baseball pitcher who is currently a free agent. He previously played in Major League Baseball (MLB) for the San Francisco Giants, Arizona Diamondbacks, and Toronto Blue Jays.

High school and college 
Bergen attended Union Grove High School in McDonough, Georgia. In 2012, as a senior, he pitched to a 6–1 win–loss record with a 1.42 earned run average (ERA). Undrafted out of high school in the 2012 Major League Baseball draft, he enrolled and played college baseball at Kennesaw State University. In 2014, he played collegiate summer baseball with the Bourne Braves of the Cape Cod Baseball League and was named a league all-star. In 2015, his junior season, he went 6–4 with a 3.15 ERA in 14 starts.

Professional career

Toronto Blue Jays
Bergen was drafted by the Toronto Blue Jays in the seventh round of the 2015 Major League Baseball draft. He made his professional debut with the Short Season-A Vancouver Canadiens. Bergen pitched in only 14 games combined in 2016 and 2017 for Vancouver and the Rookie-level Gulf Coast Blue Jays due to injuries. In 2018 he played for the Advanced-A Dunedin Blue Jays and Double-A New Hampshire Fisher Cats, combining to go 4–2 with a 0.95 ERA and 74 strikeouts in 56 innings pitched.

San Francisco Giants
On December 13, 2018, Bergen was selected by the San Francisco Giants with the eighth pick in the Rule 5 draft. He made his major league debut on March 29, 2019, versus the San Diego Padres, and retired Ian Kinsler on a ground ball, the only batter he faced. He was placed on the 10-day injured list with a shoulder strain on May 21. On August 18, 2019, Bergen was designated for assignment.

Second stint with the Blue Jays
On August 21, 2019, he was returned to the Toronto Blue Jays organization and placed on the reserve list of the Triple-A Buffalo Bisons. On August 24, 2020, Bergen's contract was selected to the major league roster.

Arizona Diamondbacks
On August 31, 2020, the Blue Jays traded Bergen to the Arizona Diamondbacks in exchange for Robbie Ray and cash considerations. In  innings, Bergen struck out eight alongside walking eight. On February 26, 2021, Bergen was designated for assignment by the Diamondbacks.

Third stint with the Blue Jays
On February 28, 2021, Bergen was acquired by the Blue Jays for cash considerations. Bergen recorded a 1.69 ERA in 10 innings of work for Toronto, and was designated for assignment on June 29. He was outrighted to the Triple-A Buffalo Bisons on July 4. On October 5, Bergen elected free agency.

San Diego Padres
On March 18, 2022, Bergen signed a minor league contract with the San Diego Padres. He was released on August 10, 2022.

Personal
Bergen and his wife, Elise, were married in 2019.

References

External links

1993 births
Living people
American expatriate baseball players in Canada
Arizona Diamondbacks players
Baseball players from Georgia (U.S. state)
Bourne Braves players
Buffalo Bisons (minor league) players
Dunedin Blue Jays players
Gulf Coast Blue Jays players
Kennesaw State Owls baseball players
Major League Baseball pitchers
New Hampshire Fisher Cats players
People from McDonough, Georgia
Sacramento River Cats players
San Francisco Giants players
San Jose Giants players
Toronto Blue Jays players
Vancouver Canadians players